Never Too Far is a studio album by American jazz singer Dianne Reeves issued in 1989 on EMI Records. The album peaked at number 1 on the US Billboard Contemporary Jazz Albums chart and No. 14 on the US Billboard Top R&B Albums chart.

Overview
Never Too Far was produced by George Duke. The album spent two weeks atop the Billboard Contemporary Jazz Albums chart. Never Too Far was also recorded at Ocean Way Recording and Le Gonks West in Los Angeles, California.

Singles
"Never Too Far" and "Come In" reached Nos. 5 and 34 on the Billboard Hot R&B Songs respectively.

Track listing

Chart history

References

1989 albums
Dianne Reeves albums
Albums produced by George Duke
EMI Records albums